Chad Hodge (born 1977) is an American writer and producer who created drama series Runaway (2006), The Playboy Club (2011), Wayward Pines (2015), and Good Behavior (2016). He wrote the Broadway stage adaptation of Irving Berlin's classic musical Holiday Inn and the film adaptation of YA trilogy The Darkest Minds (2018). He is a native of Highland Park, Illinois, and attended Northwestern University.

Early life

Hodge was born in Kansas City, Missouri, and grew up in Highland Park, Illinois, as the oldest of five siblings. He was interested in the arts from an early age, starting with theater. At five years old, his first performance was in a local production of The King & I. While attending Highland Park High School, he played leading roles in Little Shop of Horrors (Seymour), Pippin (Leading Player), and Godspell (Jesus). In the summer of 1994, Hodge attended the NHSI Cherubs theater program at Northwestern University.

Hodge then attended Northwestern University and decided to pursue different avenues in the arts. Among several extracurriculars, he was the executive producer of campus television series University Place. In 1999, he graduated with magna cum laude honors and a bachelor's degree in communication studies and business institutions.

While at Northwestern, Hodge explored his interests through various internships, including Deloitte Consulting and The Oprah Winfrey Show in Chicago, and casting director Debra Zane in Los Angeles. While interning for Zane in the summer of 1998, Hodge read the screenplay for American Beauty by Alan Ball, which Zane was casting. Hodge has said the script inspired him to want to become a screenwriter.

Hodge's youngest sister Amy Hodge is also in the entertainment industry. She is VP of Original Programming at HBO.

Career
After graduating from Northwestern, Hodge was an assistant at the William Morris Agency. He quit after three weeks when he realized he had no time to write. He got a job as a waiter and wrote whenever he could.

In 2001, he was hired by NBC to write a television pilot for their Saturday morning teen block as a vehicle for rising country music star Alecia Elliott. The show, All About Us, started airing in late 2001.

In 2003, Hodge segued to writing for primetime television drama, and wrote for several series including Veritas: The Quest (ABC) and Tru Calling (FOX). He also wrote the movie This Time Around for ABC Family.

In 2004, Hodge wrote the movie I Want to Marry Ryan Banks, starring Bradley Cooper, for ABC Family. The film is now available under the title The Reality of Love.

In 2006, Hodge created his first primetime drama series, Runaway (CW), starring Donnie Wahlberg, Leslie Hope, Dustin Milligan, and Sarah Ramos. It was the first drama series launched by The CW.

In 2011, Hodge created The Playboy Club (NBC) about the first Playboy Club in Chicago in the 1960s. The pilot was directed by Alan Taylor. The show starred Laura Benanti, Amber Heard, Jenna Dewan, Leah Renee, Naturi Naughton, Eddie Cibrian, David Krumholtz, and Jenifer Lewis.

Also in 2011, Out Magazine named Hodge one of the "Out 100" in their annual list of the most influential LGBTQ public figures.

In 2015, Hodge created Wayward Pines (FOX) based on the best-selling novel by Blake Crouch. The event series starred Matt Dillon, Terrence Howard, and Melissa Leo. The series was meant to be just ten episodes, but it performed very well and FOX ordered a second season. Hodge, however, had moved on to create another series with Blake Crouch, Good Behavior, based on Crouch's short story "The Pain of Others."

In 2016, Hodge created Good Behavior (TNT) starring Michelle Dockery and Juan Diego Botto. The show was critically well-received and aired for two seasons. Hodge was nominated for the 2018 Writers Guild of America Award for Best Dramatic Writing for the episode "The Heart Attack is the Best Way."

In 2017, Hodge returned to his theatrical roots as co-book writer for the musical stage adaptation of Holiday Inn, the 1942 Universal film starring Bing Crosby and Fred Astaire. The musical had its first production at the Goodspeed Opera House in Connecticut before opening on Broadway at the Roundabout Theatre.

In 2018, Hodge wrote the screenplay for feature film The Darkest Minds (20th Century Fox) based on the New York Times bestselling novel by Alexandra Bracken. The film starred Amandla Stenberg and Harris Dickinson.

Filmography

Film

Television
The numbers in directing and writing credits refer to the number of episodes.

Musical theatre

References

External links

Chad Hodge official website
Chad Hodge Interview on Scripts & Scribes

1977 births
Television producers from Illinois
American television writers
American gay writers
Place of birth missing (living people)
Living people
LGBT producers
American male television writers
Northwestern University alumni
People from Highland Park, Illinois
Screenwriters from Illinois
Showrunners
21st-century LGBT people